The following is a discography for American singer-songwriter and record producer and arranger, Richard Marx. It includes the list of 12 studio albums (plus a Holiday album Christmas Spirit), 13 compilation albums, 3 live albums and 91 single releases, and along with chart rankings for each album and single and RIAA (and International) certifications for the albums.

Albums

Studio albums

Notes
A^ Days In Avalon reached number 41 on  Billboard Top Independent Albums
B^ Christmas Spirit reached number 10 on Billboard Top Independent Albums Chart and number 21 on Billboard Top Holiday Albums
C^ Beautiful Goodbye reached number 6 on Billboard Top Independent Albums

Compilation albums

Notes
D^ Stories to Tell reached number 34 on Billboard Top Independent Albums Chart.

Promotional albums

Live albums

Extended plays

Unofficial albums
 Live in USA 1988/92 (1992)
 Live Music Hall Koln 1992 (1992)

Singles

Notes
!^ The chart positions in the second US column are from Billboards Adult Contemporary Tracks Chart unless otherwise mentioned. The songs that did not chart on the A.C. Chart but did on Billboards Mainstream Rock Tracks Chart or Adult Top 40 Tracks have the peak positions from those charts listed here.
E^ The chart positions in the second US column for "Don't Mean Nothing", "Have Mercy", "Satisfied", "Nothing You Can Do About It" and "Too Late to Say Goodbye" are for Billboards Mainstream Rock Tracks Chart as none of those songs charted on Billboards Adult Contemporary Tracks Chart.
F^ "Should've Known Better" charted on both Billboards Mainstream Rock Tracks Chart and Adult Contemporary Tracks Chart. On Mainstream Rock Tracks it peaked at No. 7 and on Adult Contemporary Tracks it peaked at No. 20.
G^ "At the Beginning" charted on Billboards Adult Contemporary Tracks chart at No. 2 and also charted on Radio & Records Adult Contemporary Chart at No. 1.
H^ The chart position in the second US column for "When You're Gone" is for Billboards Adult Top 40 Tracks Chart as it did not chart on Billboards Adult Contemporary Tracks Chart.
I^ "Ready to Fly" charted on both Billboards Adult Contemporary Tracks chart and Billboards Adult Top 40 Tracks Chart. On Adult Contemporary Tracks it peaked at No. 22 and on Adult Top 40 Tracks it peaked at No. 29.
J^ "All You Need Is Love" charted on Billboards Smooth Jazz Songs chart at No. 4.

Music videos

Official YouTube lyric videos

References

Discography
Rock music discographies
Discographies of American artists